Great Eagle Centre is a 35-floor office building located at 23 Harbour Road in Wan Chai North, Hong Kong. It was built in 1983. Great Eagle Holdings has its headquarters in the 33rd floor.

Tenants
 Boehringer Ingelheim
 Consulate-General of South Africa
 Trillion Trophy Asia, owners of Birmingham City F.C.
 Asian Sky Group & Asian Sky Media

Transportation
The building is directly connected to Exhibition Centre station and accessible within walking distance North from Wan Chai station on the MTR.

See also

 Great Eagle Holdings

References

Office buildings in Hong Kong
Wan Chai North

Office buildings completed in 1983